Brandau Glacier is a wide tributary glacier,  long, flowing westward from an ice divide between Haynes Table and Husky Heights to enter Keltie Glacier just west of Ford Spur. It was named by the Advisory Committee on Antarctic Names for Lieutenant Commander James F. Brandau, U.S. Navy, a pilot with Squadron VX-6, Operation Deepfreeze 1964 and 1965.

See also
 Advisory Committee on Antarctic Names
 Glaciology
 List of glaciers in the Antarctic

References 

Glaciers of Dufek Coast